Robert Hill (born 9 June 1938) is a Scottish former professional footballer who played as an inside forward in The Football League for Colchester United.

Career
Hill signed for Colchester from Easthouses Lily in 1955 and made over 200 appearances for the club as well as helping them secure promotion to the Third Division in 1961–62, before moving to non-league side Bury Town in 1965.

Honours

Club
Colchester United
 Football League Fourth Division Runner-up (1): 1961–62

References

External links

Player Profile - Bobby Hill

1938 births
Living people
Footballers from Edinburgh
Scottish footballers
Association football defenders
Colchester United F.C. players
Bury Town F.C. players